The 1996–97 Illinois Fighting Illini men's basketball team represented the University of Illinois.

Regular season
On March 21, 1996, a new era in Illinois basketball began when Director of Athletics Ron Guenther introduced
Lon Kruger as the University’s 14th men’s basketball coach. Kruger came to Illinois from the University of Florida and carried a list of impressive credentials, including guiding Florida to the Final Four in 1994. In his first year at Illinois, Kruger guided Illinois to a 22-10 record and the second round of the NCAA tournament. Over the course of the season, Illinois defeated five ranked opponents, including No. 7 Minnesota, 96-90, at the Assembly Hall. Illinois also traveled to Bloomington and handed Indiana a 78-74 loss, the first win for Illinois at Assembly Hall in Bloomington since 1990. During the course of the year, Kiwane Garris etched his name in the Illinois record book with one of the best season performances by any Illini player in history. He finished his career second on the all-time scoring list with 1,948 points and set the single-season record for free throws made and attempted. Garris averaged 19.4 points and missed being the Big Ten’s leading scorer by three one-hundredths of a point.

Roster

Source

Schedule
												
Source																
												

|-
!colspan=12 style="background:#DF4E38; color:white;"| Non-Conference regular season

	

|-
!colspan=9 style="background:#DF4E38; color:#FFFFFF;"|Big Ten regular season

|-
!colspan=9 style="text-align: center; background:#DF4E38"|NCAA tournament

|-

Player stats

NCAA basketball tournament
Southeast regional
 Illinois 90, Southern Cal 77
 Tennessee-Chattanooga 75, Illinois 63

Awards and honors
 Kiwane Garris
Associated Press All-American Honorable Mention
Team Most Valuable Player

Team players drafted into the NBA

Rankings

References

Illinois Fighting Illini
Illinois
Illinois Fighting Illini men's basketball seasons
1996 in sports in Illinois
1997 in sports in Illinois